Aemene maculifascia is a moth of the family Erebidae. It was described by Frederic Moore in 1878. It is found in China and Sikkim, India.

References

Cisthenina
Moths described in 1878
Moths of Asia